The Hanover Schützenfest in Hanover, Germany is the largest marksmen's funfair in the world. The origins of this funfair are located in the year 1529. It takes place once a year, is commercially organized and includes a big entertainment program. The Schützenfest consists of around 5,000 marksmen, 250 rides and inns, five large beer-tents and the "Marksmen's Parade". It is the longest parade in Europe and probably the world. More than one and a half million people visit this funfair every year.

See also 
 Oktoberfest Hanover, which is the second largest Oktoberfest in the world, with around 160 rides and inns, two large beer tents and around 1 million visitors each year.
 Hanover also hosts one of the two largest Spring Festivals in Europe with around 160 rides and inns, 2 large beer tents and around 1 million visitors each year.

External links 

 

Tourist attractions in Hanover
Festivals in Germany
Annual events in Germany
1529 establishments in the Holy Roman Empire